Sheila Patterson (née Caffyn; 30 March 1918 – 21 June 1998) was a British social anthropologist who specialised in race, immigration, and race and ethnic relations. She undertook research in South Africa, Canada, and the United Kingdom. From 1971 to 1987, she was editor of New Community (now named the Journal of Ethnic and Migration Studies), a journal published by the Community Relations Commission.

Selected works

References

1918 births
1998 deaths
British anthropologists
British women anthropologists
Social anthropologists
British ethnographers
20th-century anthropologists